Sándor Vándor (1901–1945) was a Hungarian Jewish composer.

Recordings

References

External links
 CD Musica & Regime 4

1901 births
1945 deaths
20th-century composers
Hungarian Jewish musicians
Hungarian Jews who died in the Holocaust